The 2012 DFL-Supercup was the third DFL-Supercup, an annual football match contested by the winners of the previous season's Bundesliga and DFB-Pokal competitions. It took place on 12 August 2012 at the Allianz Arena. The match featured Borussia Dortmund, winners of both the 2011–12 Bundesliga and 2011–12 DFB-Pokal, and Bayern Munich, runners-up in both the Bundesliga and DFB-Pokal.

Bayern Munich won the match 2–1 and captured their then-record fourth title.

Teams
In the following table, matches until 1996 were in the DFB-Supercup era, since 2010 were in the DFL-Supercup era.

Match

Details

References

2012
FC Bayern Munich matches
Borussia Dortmund matches
2012–13 in German football cups